The Indian WhatsApp lynchings are a spate of mob-related violence and killings following the spread of rumours, primarily relating to child-abduction and organ harvesting, via the WhatsApp message service. The spate of lynchings commenced in May 2017 with the killing of seven men in Jharkhand, but did not become a matter of national attention until the beginning of the following year. Fake messages customised with locally specific details are circulated along with real videos attached to fake messages or claims.

In almost all of the lynching locations, no child abductions had been recorded in the previous three months.

The majority of the attacks have occurred deep within the interior regions of villages. The lynch mobs included men, women and children. In some cases the mobs were composed largely of illiterate or poorly educated men that were unemployed or working as day labourers as well as being under the influence of alcohol at the time of the attack. In at least some of the cases prime instigators have used child-abduction fears to stir up the violence and settle old scores.

Responses 
The Indian Government does not track public lynchings and there are no official statistics from the Indian Crime Records Bureau regarding their occurrence across India.

Media coverage over the killings and efforts to debunk fake news have also been concentrated in the English and Hindi language media, with little attention given to local language reporting.

On 4 July 2018 – WhatsApp offered $50,000 in funding for researchers to develop technological and social ideas that prevent the spread of fake news.

On 10 July 2018 – WhatsApp launched a newspaper advertising campaign warning against fake news and announced changes for Indian users of the platform that labels forwarded messages as such.

Notable cases

2020 Palghar mob lynching 

On 16 April 2020, a vigilante group lynched two Hindu Sadhus and their drivers in Gadchinchale Village, Palghar District, Maharashtra, India. The incident was fuelled by WhatsApp rumours, about thieves operating in the area, during the nationwide lockdown due to the COVID-19 pandemic. The vigilante group of villagers had mistaken the three passengers as thieves and killed them. The policemen who intervened were also attacked, with four policemen and a senior police officer getting injured.

As of 20 April, 101 villagers have been arrested by the Maharashtra police on charges of murder of the three men and an investigation is ongoing. After the incident, rumours were spread to stoke religious tension. On 22 April, Maharashtra Home Minister, Anil Deshmukh posted a complete list of people arrested, and said that none of the people arrested were Muslims. The government said that both the attackers and the victims were of same religion.

2018 Karbi Anglong lynching 

The 2018 Karbi Anglong lynching occurred when two men who were visiting the Kangthilangso waterfall to search for ornamental fish stopped their vehicle to ask villagers for directions. A mob of inebriated villagers suspected them to be child abductors and attacked them with machetes, bamboo poles and wood. The two men succumbed to their injuries before they could be taken to hospital. A video was circulated of the two men covered in blood and begging for mercy.

List of attacks and lynchings

See also 
 Cow vigilante violence in India
 WhatsApp University

References 

2017 in India
2018 in India
Murder in India
Lynching deaths in India
WhatsApp
Cybercrime in India
2017 murders in India
2018 murders in India
Moral panic
Fake news in India